Andrew Agosto (born 11 September 1970) is a Puerto Rican boxer. He competed in the 1988 Summer Olympics.

References

1970 births
Living people
Boxers at the 1988 Summer Olympics
Puerto Rican male boxers
Olympic boxers of Puerto Rico
People from Carolina, Puerto Rico
Flyweight boxers